The Arcflash Labs GR-1 "Anvil" is a portable shoulder-fired semi-automatic bullpup 8-stage coilgun designed and manufactured by Arcflash Labs LLC in Los Angeles, California. It is the most powerful handheld coilgun ever sold publicly. It was developed 3 years after the EMG-01A.

Operating mechanism 
The GR-1 uses a clamped quasi-resonant (CQR) step-up inverter described in U.S. Patent 10,811,995, which allows a six-cell 25.2 volt lithium-ion polymer battery to supply up to 1000 watts of power to eight high-voltage electrolytic capacitors in approximately three seconds. As with most coilguns, the eight aforementioned capacitors are used to power eight respective electromagnetic coils in the configuration of a linear motor to accelerate a ferromagnetic or conducting projectile to high velocity.

Legality 

Under United States law, “firearms” are defined as propelling a projectile by combustion. Coilguns such as the GR-1 do not have any combustion mechanism, and therefore are not legally considered firearms. However, Arcflash Labs legally refers to the GR-1 as an air gun out of an abundance of caution.

References 

Firearms of the United States
Products introduced in 2021